Venomous mammals are animals of the class Mammalia that produce venom, which they use to kill or disable prey, to defend themselves from predators or conspecifics or in agonistic encounters. Mammalian venoms form a heterogeneous group with different compositions and modes of action, from three orders of mammals: Eulipotyphla, Monotremata, and Chiroptera. It has been proposed that some members of a fourth order, Primates, are venomous. To explain the rarity of venom delivery in Mammalia, Mark Dufton of the University of Strathclyde has suggested that modern mammalian predators do not need venom because they are able to kill quickly with their teeth or claws, whereas venom, no matter how sophisticated, requires time to disable prey.

In spite of the rarity of venom among extant mammals, venom may be an ancestral feature among mammals, as venomous spurs akin to those of the modern platypus are found in most non-therian Mammaliaformes groups.

Venom is much more common among other vertebrates; there are many more species of venomous reptiles (e.g. venomous snakes) and fish (e.g. stonefish). Some birds are poisonous to eat or touch (e.g. hooded pitohui) though no bird species is known to be venomous. There are only a few species of venomous amphibians; certain salamandrid salamanders can extrude sharp venom-tipped ribs.

Definitions
Several definitions of venomous animals have been proposed.

Bücherl states that venomous animals must possess at least one venom gland, a mechanism for excretion or extrusion of the venom, and apparatus with which to inflict wounds.

Mebs writes that venomous animals produce venom in a group of cells or gland, and have a tool, the venom apparatus, which delivers the venom by injection during a bite or sting. The venom apparatus in this definition encompasses both the gland and the injection device, which must be directly connected.

Fry et al. found that a venom is a secretion produced in a specialized gland in one animal and delivered to a target animal through the infliction of a wound. This secretion must contain molecules that disrupt normal physiological processes so as to facilitate feeding or defense by the producing animal. Additionally, the feeding secretion of hematophagous specialists (e.g. vampire bats) may be regarded as a specialized subtype of venom.

Evolutionary history and paleontology
Venomous mammals may have been more common in the past. Most non-therian mammals possess tarsal spurs akin to those of the modern platypus, suggesting that this feature was very widespread, with gobiconodontids and Zhangheotherium being among the clearer examples. The absence of venom spurs in non-Mammaliaformes cynodonts suggests that venom was an ancient mammalian synapomorphy and ancestral characteristic.

Canine teeth dated at 60 million years old from two extinct species, the shrew-like Bisonalveus browni and another unidentified mammal, show grooves that some palaeontologists have argued are indicative of a venomous bite. However, other scientists have questioned this conclusion given that many living non-venomous mammals also have deep grooves down the length of their canines (e.g., many primates, coatis and fruit bats), suggesting that this feature does not always reflect an adaptation to venom delivery.

Examples

Eulipotyphla (previously known as insectivores)
With the exception of vampire bats, the Eulipotyphla are the only mammals so far observed to produce toxic saliva. These species have significantly enlarged and granular submaxillary salivary glands from which the toxic saliva is produced.

The Cuban solenodon (Atopogale cubana) and Hispaniolan solenodon (Solenodon paradoxus) look similar to large shrews. They both have venomous bites; the venom is delivered from modified salivary glands via grooves in their second lower incisors. Recent study has identified the gene regulatory network responsible for the development of venom delivery systems in these small mammals. Due to the overexpression of kallikreins in their saliva, solenodon bites cause vasodilation and may result in circulatory shock. It was reported that death was frequent among Hispaniolan solenodons kept together in the same enclosure, with bite marks on their feet being the only observable cause. Such use in competition may be a secondary aspect of the insectivore venom.

The northern short-tailed shrew (Blarina brevicauda), Mediterranean water shrew (Neomys anomalus), and Eurasian water shrew (Neomys fodiens) are capable of delivering a venomous bite. Other American short-tailed shrews: the southern short-tailed shrew (Blarina carolinensis), Elliot's short-tailed shrew (Blarina hylophaga), and Everglades short-tailed shrew (Blarina peninsulae) and the Transcaucasian water shrew (Neomys teres) possibly also have a venomous bite. Shrews cache various prey in a comatose state, including earthworms, insects, snails, and to a lesser extent, small mammals such as voles and mice. This behaviour is an adaption to winter. In this context, the shrew venom acts as a tool to sustain a living hoard, thus ensuring food supply when capturing prey is difficult. This is especially important considering the high metabolic rate of shrews. Arguments against this suggest that the venom is used as a tool to hunt larger prey. Insectivores have an enhanced dependence on vertebrate food material, which is larger and more dangerous than their power to weight ratio would allow, thus requiring an extra asset to overcome these difficulties. Extant shrews do not have specialized venom delivery apparatus. Their teeth do not have channels, but a concavity on the first incisors may collect and transmit saliva from the submaxillary ducts, which open near the base of these teeth.

The European mole (Talpa europaea), and possibly other species of mole, have toxins in their saliva that can paralyze earthworms, allowing the moles to store them alive for later consumption.

Male platypus

Both male and female platypuses (Ornithorhyncus anatinus) hatch with keratinised spurs on the hind limbs, although the females lose these during development. The spurs are connected to the venom-producing crural glands, forming the crural system. During the mating season these glands become highly active, producing venom to be delivered by the channeled spur. Echidnas, the other monotremes, have spurs but no functional venom glands. Although not potent enough to be lethal to humans, platypus venom is nevertheless so excruciating that victims may sometimes be temporarily incapacitated. Platypus envenomation was fairly common when the animal was still hunted for its fur. Nowadays any close contact with the animal is rare and restricted to biologists, zookeepers and anglers (who occasionally catch them in fishing lines or nets).

When platypuses attack, they drive their hind legs together with considerable force so that the spurs are embedded in the flesh caught between and if venom is being produced, a few milliliters are injected by repeated jabbing. The spurs have enough strength to support the weight of the platypus, which often hangs from the victim, requiring assistance for removal.

Most of the evidence now supports the proposition that the venom system is used by males on one another as a weapon when competing for females, taking part in sexual selection. During this season, males become more aggressive and are found with punctures in their bodies, especially in the tail region. Adult male platypuses largely avoid each other, outside of this mating rivalry.

Platypus venom is likely retained from its distant non-monotreme ancestors, being the last living example of what was once a common characteristic among mammals. Fossil records show that venom delivery systems were not sexually dimorphic in ancestral monotremes. It has been hypothesized that venom spurs were once used for defense against predators. Proteins derived from platypus venom are being studied for potential analgesic properties.

Vampire bats
The definition of venom by Fry et al. (see Definitions) regards the feeding secretions of hematophagous (blood eating) specialists as a particular subtype of venom. In this context, the subfamily Desmodontinae represents the venomous mammals from the order Chiroptera. This group comprises the most well known venomous bat, the common vampire bat (Desmodus rotundus) and two other rare species, the hairy-legged vampire bat (Diphylla ecaudata) and the white-winged vampire bat (Diaemus youngi). These bats produce toxic saliva with anticoagulant properties and have a series of anatomical and physiological adaptations to allow nourishment based solely on blood. The majority of their prey do not perish from the attack or contact with the venom.

Primates 
Slow lorises (of the genera Nycticebus and Xanthonycticebus) are accepted as the only known venomous primate. Slow loris venom was known in folklore in their host countries throughout southeast Asia for centuries; but dismissed by Western science until the 1990s. There are nine recognised species of this small-bodied nocturnal primate. They possess a dual composite venom consisting of saliva and brachial gland exudate, a malodourous fluid forming from an apocrine sweat gland on the animal's forearm. Both fluids have been demonstrated as being venomous individually and creating a more potent venom when mixed. Slow loris brachial gland exudate (BGE) has been shown to possess up to 142 volatile components, and possesses a variant of the cat allergen protein Fel-D1. The BGE has several ecological functions including anti-parasitic defence and communication. Slow loris saliva has been shown to be cytotoxic to human skin cells in laboratory experiments without the administration of BGE.

The venom is administered through morphologically distinct dentition in the form of an adapted toothcomb. In the wild envenomation occurs from intraspecific competition; whereby two slow lorises fight for mates, food or territory. Slow loris inflicted wounds are a major cause of premature death in zoo and wildlife slow loris populations; often resulting in festering and necrotic wounds. Slow loris envenomation in humans is rare, but can result in near fatal anaphylactic shock. A suite of additional effects of the venom have been documented including mild to permanent disfigurement and mobility loss. The study of slow loris venom was brought to the public attention in 2012 by the research of the primatologist Prof. K.A.I Nekaris and in her BBC documentary The Jungle Gremlins of Java.

Arguably venomous mammals

Eulipotyphla (previously known as insectivores) 

Hedgehogs (Erinaceinae) anoint their spines with a range of toxic and irritating substances. They will sometimes kill toads (Bufo sp.), bite into the toads' poison glands and smear the toxic mixture on their spines.

Tenrecs, which are similar in appearance to hedgehogs but from a different line of evolutionary descent, may also have separately evolved self-anointing behaviour.

Rodentia  

The African crested rat (Lophiomys imhausi) has a mane of long, coarse black-and-white banded hairs which extends from the top of the animal's head to just beyond the base of the tail. This mane is bordered by a broad, white-bordered strip of hairs covering an area of glandular skin on the flank. When the animal is threatened or excited, the mane erects and this flank strip parts, exposing the glandular area. The hairs in this flank area are highly specialised; at the tips they are like ordinary hair, but are otherwise spongy, fibrous, and absorbent. The rat is known to deliberately chew the roots and bark of the poison-arrow tree (Acokanthera schimperi), so-called because human hunters extract a toxin, ouabain, to coat arrows that can kill an elephant. After the rat has chewed the tree, it deliberately slathers the resulting mixture onto its specialised flank hairs which are adapted to rapidly absorb the poisonous mixture, acting like a lamp wick. It thereby creates a defense mechanism that can sicken or even kill predators which attempt to bite it.

Chemical defence 
Skunks (Mustelidae) can eject a noxious fluid from glands near their anus. It is not only foul smelling, but can cause skin irritation and, if it gets in the eyes, temporary blindness. Some members of the mustelid family, such as the striped polecat (Ictonyx striatus), also have this capacity to an extent. Pangolins can also emit a noxious smelling fluid from glands near the anus. The greater long-nosed armadillo can release a disagreeable musky odor when threatened.

See also 
 Venomous fish
 Toxicofera
 Toxic birds
 List of venomous animals
 Venomous snakes
 Poisonous amphibians

References

Notes

Bibliography

External links

Shrew handbook
Shrew venom
Northern short-tailed shrew venom
Platypus venom
Slow Loris Research by a toxicologist - includes photos.
Slow loris venom